Pseudocollinia is a genus of parasitoid ciliate of the Colliniidae family.

References

Ciliate genera
Oligohymenophorea